Basner may refer to:

4267 Basner, an asteroid
Veniamin Basner a Russian composer
Bazna (pig) or Basner, a breed of pig